Harmon of Michigan is a 1941 American film starring Anita Louise and Larry Parks. Ostensibly a biopic about University of Michigan football player Tom Harmon's post-collegiate career as a coach, it was actually filmed immediately upon his graduation and is thus entirely fictional. Harmon, who was an all-American and Heisman Trophy winner at Michigan, plays himself in the film.

Cast
Tom Harmon as himself
Anita Louise as Peggy Adams
Forest Evashevski as himself
Oscar O'Shea as "Pop" Branch
Warren Ashe as Bill Morgan
Stanley Brown as Freddy Davis
Ken Christy as Joe Scudder
Tim Ryan as Flash Regan
William Hall as Coach Jimmy Wayburn
Larry Parks as Harvey
Lloyd Bridges as Ozzie
Chester Conklin as Gasoline Chuck

External links

Harmon of Michigan at TCMDB

1941 films
1940s biographical drama films
American biographical drama films
American black-and-white films
American football films
Biographical films about sportspeople
Columbia Pictures films
Cultural depictions of players of American football
1940s English-language films
Films directed by Charles Barton
Michigan Wolverines football
1941 drama films
1940s American films